Juha Mäkelä (born 14 March 1956) is a Finnish sports shooter. He competed in the mixed skeet event at the 1984 Summer Olympics.

References

1956 births
Living people
Finnish male sport shooters
Olympic shooters of Finland
Shooters at the 1984 Summer Olympics
Sportspeople from Tampere